Spin lock may refer to:
 Spin lock, a part of artillery fuze mechanism which arms the munition upon firing
 Spinlock, a concept in multithread programming